Tasos Kostis (born 14 January 1951) is a Greek film and voice actor. He appeared in more than sixty films since 1980. He's also participated in many dubs.

Selected filmography

Dub of TV shows

References

External links

1951 births
Living people
Greek male film actors
Greek male voice actors
Actors from Piraeus